Eumenogaster eumenes is a moth of the subfamily Arctiinae. It was described by Gottlieb August Wilhelm Herrich-Schäffer in 1856. It is found in Brazil.

References

 

Arctiinae
Moths described in 1856